Louise Profeit-LeBlanc is an Aboriginal storyteller, cultural educator artist, writer, choreographer, and film script writer from the Northern Tutchone Nation, Athabaskan language spoken in northeastern Yukon in Canada. She was raised in Mayo.

Early life and education
Profeit-LeBlanc was raised in the First Nation of Na-Cho Nyäk Dun (English: First Nation of the Big River People) in the Yukon Territory in Canada. She grew up in the cultural lifestyle of the Na-Cho Nyäk Dun, speaking the Northern Tutchone language, an endangered Athabaskan language. Many of the First Nation members in this area are still very traditional, as they continue to live off the land while also holding employment positions where ever they reside.

Profeit-LeBlanc attended a boarding school in her primary grades but her grandmother withdrew her from the boarding school because the teachers were talking "more about 'sin' than learning about God."

In her teen years, Profeit-LeBlanc attended the Yukon Hall residential school in Whitehorse, Yukon.

Career

Storyteller 
Louise Profeit-LeBlanc, was taught the craft of storytelling by her aunt Angela Sidney, who devoted her life to preserving the stories of the Tagish of Southern Yukon. Profeit-LeBlanc, who grew up listening to stories told by her Kookum, captivated the audience with a fable about jealousy." Sidney emphasized the need to be cognizant of the needs of the audience, preface the telling with a prayer, and seek forgiveness before offense is taken. Profeit-LeBlanc went on to become keeper of stories from the Nacho Nyak Dun First Nation.

Profeit-LeBlanc

Profeit-LeBlanc identified four categories of Aboriginal storytelling in the Yukon;

Yukon International Storytelling Festival 
In the 1980s, Profeit-LeBlanc and storyteller Anne Taylor were cofounders  of the Yukon International Storytelling Festival, in Whitehorse, Yukon which was held every summer generally in an outdoor setting.  Profeit-LeBlanc, from the Northern Tutchone Nation, was the niece of Angela Sidney  (1902 – 1991), one the Yukon's last Tagish. Sidney had devoted her life to preserving the stories of the Tagish of Southern Yukon, Profeit-LeBlanc and Taylor were motivated to found a more local venue for sharing Yukon stories when they realized that Sidney had had to travel in 1984 Toronto Festival of Storytelling to disseminate her peoples' stories to a world audience. In 1987 interested parties came together to plan the first Yukon Storytelling Festival in 1988. It later grew beyond the scope of Yukon and Canada to attract storytellers from all over the world with an emphasis on native peoples storytelling and circumpolar countries.

Society of Yukon Artists of Native Ancestry 
Profeit-LeBlanc was cofounder of the Society of Yukon Artists of Native Ancestry.

Media arts 
Profeit wrote a piece for the New Media Arts program at Banff in 2006.

Canada Council for the Arts
Profeit-LeBlanc worked as Coordinator of the Aboriginal Arts Office at the Canada Council for the Arts in Ottawa, Ontario where she served the needs of many Aboriginal artists of Canada and abroad. The Canada Council for the Arts helped to bring the work of Rebecca Belmore to the Venice Biennale hip-hop electronica band A Tribe Called Red to the WOMEX World Music Expo in Thessaloniki, Greece in 2012 and the Association of Performing Arts Presenters in New York City in 2013.

Personal life
Profeit-LeBlanc served on the National Spiritual Assembly of the Bahá'ís of Canada.

References

Sources 

 
 
 

 
 
 Video recording

External links
International Storytelling Center
International listing of links to storytelling festivals
First Nation of Na-Cho Nyak Dun website
Nacho Nyak Dun page on the Council of Yukon First Nations web site
Government of Canada's Department of Indian and Northern Affairs First Nation profile
 Yukon Native Language Center : Northern Tutchone
 OLAC resources in and about the Northern Tutchone language

1951 births
Living people
20th-century First Nations writers
21st-century First Nations writers
21st-century Canadian women writers
Canadian storytellers
Women storytellers
First Nations women writers
People from Whitehorse
Tutchone people
Writers from Yukon
20th-century Canadian women writers
Canadian Bahá'ís